The men's team sprint event in cycling at the 2000 Summer Olympics was contested by twelve teams.  The races were held on Sunday, 17 September at the Dunc Gray Velodrome.

Medalists

Results
 Q denotes qualification by place in heat.
 q denotes qualification by overall place.
 REL denotes relegated- due to being passed
 DNS denotes did not start.
 DNF denotes did not finish.
 DQ denotes disqualification.

Qualifying round
The twelve teams of three riders raced the course without competition in the qualifying round.  The top eight qualified for the first round, while the bottom four received final rankings based on their times in the qualifying round.

First round
In the first round of match competition, teams raced head-to-head.  The two fastest winners advanced to the finals, the other two winners competed for the bronze medal and fourth place, and losers received final rankings (fifth through eight places) based on their times in the round.

Medal round

Final classification
The final classification was

References

External links
Official Olympic Report

M
Cycling at the Summer Olympics – Men's team sprint
Track cycling at the 2000 Summer Olympics
Men's events at the 2000 Summer Olympics